

Miron Radu Paraschivescu (2 October 1911 – 17 February 1971) was a Romanian poet, essayist, journalist, and translator.

Born in Zimnicea, Teleorman County, he went to high school in Ploiești, after which he studied fine arts, first in Cluj and later in Bucharest, without graduating. He then enrolled at the Letters and Philosophy Department of the University of Bucharest.

A leftist in his youth (he joined the Union of Communist Youth in 1933), he wrote for many leftist papers and magazines of those days: "Cuvîntul liber", "Azi", "Facla", "Viața românească", "Era nouă", "Lumea românească", "Timpul", "Ecoul", "România Liberă", "Scînteia", sometimes under a pen name, among them Emil Soare and Paul Scorțeanu. After World War II, he wrote many propagandistic articles, although it seems that he never became a member of the Communist Party itself.

Being on friendly terms with many communist leaders from their days in the underground, including Miron Constantinescu, Constanța Crăciun, Iosif Chișinevschi, Leonte Răutu, he was considered "invulnerable", and got away with criticizing the regime, mostly in private, when anybody else would have ended in prison for the same offence. Although he hoped, due to his antifascist past, to be given important government positions like his former comrades, he never got any, being sent instead to work for several magazines and papers.

He and Sorin Toma bitterly criticized Tudor Arghezi in 1948, accusing the latter of being a representative of "decadent, bourgeois art".

In 1965, Paraschivescu took charge of the readers' column at the literary magazine Ramuri in Craiova, changing it in May 1966 into a four-page literary supplement called Povesta vorbei ("The Tale of Talk"). It lasted only six numbers. He transformed it into a meeting place for a number of young avant-garde writers who had difficulty getting published by the established literary press. Among them were Leonid Dimov, Virgil Mazilescu, and Dumitru Țepeneag.

Known for being sometimes a "difficult person" and a "big mouth", Paraschivescu was hospitalized at least twice in mental institutions.

Somewhat of a Don Juan, Paraschivescu was married five times.

Writings
Oameni și așezări din Țara Moților și a Basarabilor, Craiova, 1938
Cântice țigănești, București, 1941; illustrated by Marcel Chirnoagă, București, 1972
Pâine, pământ și țărani, Craiova, 1943
Cântare României, București, 1951
Laude, București, 1953
Laude şi alte poeme, București, 1959
Declarația patetică, București, 1960
Poezii, București, 1961
Declaraţia patetică. Cântice țigănești. Laude și alte poeme, București, 1963
Bâlci la Râureni, București, 1964
Versul liber, București, 1965
Drumuri şi răspântii, București, 1967
Tristele, București, 1968
Scrieri, vol. I-II, București, 1969, vol. III-IV, București, 1974–1975
Poeme, București, 1971
Ultimele, București, 1971
Poezii, edited and afterword by Ioan Adam, București, 1973
Amintiri, București, 1975
Journal d'un heretique, translated by Claude Jaillet, foreword by de Virgil Ierunca, Paris, 1976; edition (Jurnalul unui cobai. 1940–1954), edited by Maria Cordoneanu, foreword by Vasile Igna, Cluj Napoca, 1994Povestind copiilor, București, 1990Jurnalul unui cobai, 1994Poeme, Iaşi, 2000

Translations
Marie-Anne Desmarest, Torente, București, 1943
Konstantin Simonov, Apărarea Moscovei, București, 1944
Nikolai Tikhonov, Istorisiri din Leningrad, București, 1944
Mikhail Sholokhov, Şcoala urii, București, 1944
Jean Richard Bloch, Toulon, București, 1945
Alexander Pushkin, Basme..., illustrated by  Th. Kiriacoff-Suruceanu, București, 1945, Ruslan și Ludmila, București, 1951
Translations of eight European poets, illustrated by Mircea Alitanti, București, 1946
Claude Roy, Parisul răsculat, București, 1946
Maxim Gorki, Univesităţile mele, București, 1948
Nikolay Nekrasov, Poeme alese, București, 1953, Gerul, moşu cu nasu roşu, București, 1955, Opere alese, I-III, București, 1955–1959, Femeile ruse. Decembristele, București, 1956
Adam Mickiewicz, Pan Tadeusz sau Ultima încălcare de pământ în Lituania, foreword by Olga Zaicik, București, 1956, Poezii, București, 1957 (with Vlaicu Bârna şi Virgil Teodorescu), Poezii, București 1959
Juliusz Słowacki, Ceasul meditării, illustrated by Mihu Vulcănescu, București, 1962
Giuseppe Ungaretti, Poezii, București, 1963 (with Alexandru Balaci)
Andre Malraux, Calea regală, București, 1971

Awards
The Romanian Academy's "George Coșbuc" Award (1956)
Honorary citizen of Vălenii de Munte (post-mortem, 2011)

References
Aurel Sasu, Dicționar biografic al literaturii române (M-Z)'', Paralela 45, Pitești, 2006, pp. 300–301

1911 births
1971 deaths
People from Zimnicea
Romanian male poets
Romanian translators
Romanian journalists
Romanian essayists
Romanian communists
20th-century translators
20th-century Romanian poets
Male essayists
20th-century essayists
Recipients of the Order of the Star of the Romanian Socialist Republic
20th-century journalists